László Rajk Jr. (26 January 1949, Budapest – 11 September 2019) was a Hungarian architect, designer and political activist.

Biography 
As an architect, he became the member of the Hungarian avantgarde movement. From 1975 he joined the Democratic Opposition, the underground political movement in Hungary, therefore from 1980 he was blacklisted, and was not allowed to work under his own name.

In 1981 with Gábor Demszky (Mayor of Budapest from 1990) he founded the independent, underground AB Publishing House, and ran an illegal bookstore from his apartment called "Samizdat Boutique".

In 1988 he was one of the founders of the Network of Free Initiatives and the liberal party, the Alliance of Free Democrats, and served six years in the Hungarian Parliament after free elections in 1990. Recently he worked as an architect and a production designer for films and taught film architecture at the Hungarian Film Academy in Budapest.
Married to Judit Rajk (1991-)

Politics
The son of the well known show trial victim, Hungary's foreign minister László Rajk, Rajk Jr. was famous in his own right for political/anti-regime activities.

Awards
He was a Chevalier dans l'Ordre National du Merite, 1999, France.

Works

Buildings

Film sets
Over 25 years' experience in building filmsets for international and Hungarian films and documentaries including:

References

Sources
 
Kofahajó

1949 births
2019 deaths
Architects from Budapest
Alliance of Free Democrats politicians
20th-century Hungarian architects
21st-century Hungarian architects
Members of the National Assembly of Hungary (1990–1994)
Members of the National Assembly of Hungary (1994–1998)
Politicians from Budapest
Members of the Széchenyi Academy of Literature and Arts